Episode 14 may refer to:
 "Episode 14" (Primeval)
 "Episode 14" (Twin Peaks)
 "Episode 14" (Ugly Betty episode)